Canzés (also written Canzees) is a variety of Brianzöö (a Western Lombard dialect) spoken in the commune of Canzo, Italy.

Historical and Cultural Characteristics 
Canzés is spoken by approximately 2000 people in and near the town of Canzo. Its lexicon is partially shared with Brianzöö. In comparison with common Brianzöö, Canzés has a broader variety of stylistic registers, from peasant style to courtly style. Because Canzo is in the  northernmost zone of the Brianza, Canzés preserves lexical archaisms better than modern Milanese, and has changed less under the influence of Italian.

In the Linguistic and Ethnographic Atlas of Italy and Southern Switzerland (AIS) of the Universities of Bern and Zurich (1928–1940) and in the Acoustic Vivarium of Italian Languages and Dialects (VivALDI) of the Humboldt University of Berlin (1998–2018) Canzo has been chosen as the only linguistic tracing point of a very large area, including not only the entire macro-Brianza, but also the entire provinces of Como and Milan (except for the Bustocco-Legnanese linguistic island). Indeed, Canzo has characteristics of conservation and authenticity otherwise absent in this geographic area, historically much innovative. For this reason it can be said that Canzés dialect – while preserving, in some of its registers, peculiar local features – is the reference variety for a study of the most archaic elements of the most prestigious variant of the Lombard language (see Milanese dialect).

Historical origins 
The language descends from Latin with some influence from a Celtic substratum due to the original inhabitants of the region, the Insubres, Lambrani, Lepontii, and Orobi (local populations already merged with Gauls).  Langobardic made an impact as a superstratum, as did the languages of later Spanish, French and Austrian rulers. Canzés is famous as the language of magicians and vagabonds and is seldom spoken today.

Phonology

Consonants

Vowels
Contrasts exist between long and short vowels in stressed syllables, but in unstressed syllables the contrast is neutralized.

  and  have  as a rare allophone;

Semivowels

Comparison with related languages 
Phonetically, it is evident, for example, the predominance of vowel  or similar (written a), instead of unstressed  (written e). In Canzés, instead of Milanese nasalization of vowel, there is a velar nasal (written n) with abbreviation of the vowel. The final consonants are always voiceless. Written v have a very weak sound, almost semivocalic. Letter s before consonant is usually aspirated. There are many phenomena of assimilation or adaptation, caused by meeting of two words, especially in crashes of consonants.

Literature 
In the little written literature, almost totally poetry, bloomed in the 1970s basing on Brianzöö and Milanese literatures (born in the 13th century), it is used a simple orthography, adherent to the pronunciation and based on Italian and Milanese ones, using diaeresis, letter j for semivocalic i, not applying the circumflex accent but the redoubling of long vowels, or the redoubling of consonant for short vowels.

The wide oral literature is composed by proverbs, poems, legends, prayers, that have histories of several centuries. An important role of Canzés and other local languages is in toponyms, often derived from Celtic words, and traditional gentilics.

Examples
There are some examples of written and oral literature.

Use 
There are variants also within the borough, according to the social class and the zone, for influence in the first case from Milanese and from common Brianzöö, in the second case from the neighbouring villages. It can be said that every joint family has own dialect of Canzés because, until the half of 20th century, every joint family was very united and isolated in the cuurt (the local kind of courtyard) world.

Canzés, even if it has a consistent heritage of oral and written literature, besides high importance for the local identity, does not have an official recognition, so it is getting uncommon in young generations. Western Lombard has a general recognition, but none from State. UNESCO and Ethnologue consider Lombard language as union of Western Lombard, Eastern Lombard and intermediate varieties.

Bibliography 
 Tiziano Corti, In ucasiun, 2005.
 Cumitaa F.N., Librett da la Festa di Nost, 1988–2003.
 Stefano Prina, Al Cadreghin - gazetin di bagaj da Canz, 2003–2007 (in particular n° 9bis of 2006).
 Gigliola Campiotti, Proverbi e modi di dire Lariani, 1997.
 Andrea Rognoni, Grammatica dei dialetti della Lombardia, 2005.
 Several authors, Parlate e dialetti della Lombardia. Lessico comparato, 2003.

References

Lombard language